Vitanje Vas (also Vitanja vas or Vitanjska vas) is a former settlement in the Municipality of Vitanje in northeastern Slovenia. It is now part of the town of Vitanje. The area is part of the traditional region of Styria. The municipality is now included in the Savinja Statistical Region.

Geography
Vitanje Vas lies in the northern part of Vitanje, separated from the main part of the town by the Hudinja River. It is the older part of the now-combined town. Jesenica Creek flows to the west of the settlement and Hočna Creek to the east; both are tributaries of the Hudinja. The street name Na vasi (literally, 'in the village') in the settlement reflects its name.

History
Vitanje Vas was merged with the main settlement of Vitanje Trg in 1953 to create the combined settlement of Vitanje.

Cultural heritage
The parish church in Vitanje stands in Vitanje Vas.

References

External links
Vitanja Vas on Geopedia

Populated places in the Municipality of Vitanje
Former settlements in Slovenia